The Monastery of San Isidoro del Campo (Spanish: monasterio de San Isidoro del Campo) is a monastery located in Santiponce, Spain. It was declared Bien de Interés Cultural (Spanish Property of Cultural Interest) in 1872.

The monastery was founded in 1301 by Alonso Pérez de Guzmán.

The interior houses an altarpiece by Juan Martínez Montañes.

References

See also 

 List of Bien de Interés Cultural in the Province of Seville

Bien de Interés Cultural landmarks in the Province of Seville